The Galena Group or Galena Limestone refers to a sedimentary sequence of Ordovician limestone that was deposited atop the Decorah Shale. It is part of the Ordovician stratigraphy of the Upper Midwestern United States. It was deposited in a calm marine environment, and is fossiliferous.

References

Geologic groups of Minnesota
Ordovician Minnesota